The 2021 World Rugby Women's Sevens Series was a planned series of rugby sevens tournaments for national women's rugby sevens teams that was cancelled due to impacts of the COVID-19 pandemic. Instead of an official season of the Women's Sevens Series, two invitational "Fast Four" tournaments were played in Canada.

Teams
Following the cancellation of all official tournaments scheduled for the 2021 series, two invitational events were contested by the following teams:

 
 
 
 

Mexico replaced France after a late withdrawal by France due to travel issues.

Tour venues
In July 2021, four tournaments had been planned for the women's tour but all were subsequently cancelled due to impacts of the COVID-19 pandemic.

 The Paris (October 2021) and Hong Kong (5–7 November 2021) events were cancelled on 5 August 2021.

 The Singapore (29–30 October 2021) and Cape Town (10–12 December 2021) events were cancelled on 3 September 2021.

Two invitational tournaments were played instead:

See also
 2021 World Rugby Sevens Series (for men) 
 Rugby sevens at the 2020 Summer Olympics

References

External links
Official site

 
2021
2021 rugby sevens competitions
2021 in women's rugby union
Rugby events cancelled due to the COVID-19 pandemic
World Rugby Women's Sevens Series